Mahmudwala is a village in the Firozpur district of Punjab, India. It is located in the Zira tehsil. It is located on the Lohian Khas-Makhu road (National Highway 703A).

Demographics 

According to the 2011 census of India, Mahmudwala has 145 households. The effective literacy rate (i.e. the literacy rate of population excluding children aged 6 and below) is 52.76%.

References 

Villages in Zira tehsil